In enzymology, a guanidinoacetase is an enzyme that catalyzes the chemical reaction

guanidinoacetate + H2O  glycine + urea

Thus, the two substrates of this enzyme are guanidinoacetate and H2O, whereas its two products are glycine and urea.

This enzyme belongs to the family of hydrolases, those acting on carbon-nitrogen bonds other than peptide bonds, specifically in linear amidines.  The systematic name of this enzyme class is guanidinoacetate amidinohydrolase. This enzyme is also called glycocyaminase.  It employs one cofactor, manganese.

References

 
 

EC 3.5.3
Manganese enzymes
Enzymes of unknown structure